A - B - C - D - E - F - G - H - I - J - K - L - M - N - O - P - Q - R - S - T - U - V - W - XYZ

This is a list of rivers in the United States that have names starting with the letter R.  For the main page, which includes links to listings by state, see List of rivers in the United States.

Ra 
Rabbit River - Michigan
Rabbit River - Minnesota, tributary of Bois de Sioux River
Rabbit River - Minnesota, tributary of Mississippi River
Raccoon Creek - New Jersey
Raccoon Creek - Beaver County, Pennsylvania
Raccoon Creek - Erie County, Pennsylvania
Raccoon River - Iowa
Raft River - Utah, Idaho
Raging River - Washington
Rahway River - New Jersey
Rainbow River - Florida
Rainy River - Minnesota
Ramapo River - New York, New Jersey
Rancocas Creek - New Jersey
Rangeley River - Maine
Rapid Creek - South Dakota
Rapid River - Maine
Rapid River - Delta County, Michigan (Upper Peninsula)
Rapid River - Kalkaska County, Michigan (Lower Peninsula)
Rapid River - Ontonagon County, Michigan (Upper Peninsula)
Rapidan River - Virginia
Rappahannock River - Virginia
Raquette River - New York
Raritan River - New Jersey
Raspberry River - Wisconsin
Rattle River - New Hampshire
Rattlesnake Creek - Ohio
Rattlesnake River - New Hampshire
Raystown Branch Juniata River - Pennsylvania

Re - Rh 
Red River - Kentucky
Red River - Minnesota, Wisconsin
Red River - Tennessee, Kentucky
Red River - Texas, Oklahoma, Arkansas, Louisiana
Red River - Wisconsin (tributary of Lake Michigan)
Red River - Wisconsin (tributary of Wolf River)
Red River of the North - Minnesota, North Dakota
Red Bird River - Kentucky
Red Cedar River - Michigan
Red Cedar River - Wisconsin
Red Clay Creek - Delaware
Red Hill River - New Hampshire
Red Lake River - Minnesota
Red Rock River - Montana
Redbank Creek - Pennsylvania
Reddies River - North Carolina
Redeye River - Minnesota
Redwater River - Montana
Redwood River - Minnesota
Reedy Creek - West Virginia
Reedy River - South Carolina
Reese River - Nevada
Republican River - Colorado, Nebraska, Kansas
Rhode River - Maryland

Ri 
Ribault River - Florida
Rice Creek - Minnesota
Rice Fork - California
Richmond Creek - New York
Rio Chama - Colorado, New Mexico
Rio Grande - Colorado, New Mexico, Texas
Rio Hondo - California
Rio Puerco - New Mexico
Rio Ruidoso - New Mexico
Rivanna River - Virginia
River des Peres - Missouri
River Raisin - Michigan
River Rouge - Michigan

Ro 
Roanoke River - Virginia, North Carolina
Roaring River - Missouri
Roaring River - North Carolina
Roaring River - Tennessee
Roaring Fork River - Colorado
Robinson River - Virginia
Rock Creek - Maryland, District of Columbia
Rock Creek (Clear Creek) - Wyoming
Rock Creek (Medicine Bow River) - Wyoming
Rock River - Illinois, Wisconsin
Rock River - Minnesota, Iowa
Rock River - Vermont (northern)
Rock River - Vermont (southern)
Rockaway River - New Jersey
Rockcastle River - Kentucky
Rockfish River - Virginia
Rocky Branch - New Hampshire
Rocky River - Alaska
Rocky River - Connecticut
Rocky River - Michigan
Rocky River - Ohio
Rocky River - South Carolina
Rocky River - Tennessee
Roe River - Montana
Roger Island River - Massachusetts
Rogue River - Michigan
Rogue River - Oregon
Rolling Fork - Arkansas
Rolling Fork Salt River - Kentucky
Rondout Creek - New York
Rooster River - Connecticut
Root River - Minnesota
Root River - Wisconsin (tributary of Des Plaines River)
Root River - Wisconsin (tributary of Lake Michigan)
Roseau River - Minnesota
Rough River - Kentucky
Row River - Oregon
Rowley River - Massachusetts
Royal River - Maine

Ru 
Rubicon River - California
Rubicon River - Wisconsin
Ruby River - Montana
Rio Ruidoso - New Mexico
Rum River - Minnesota
Rumford River - Massachusetts
Runnins River - Massachusetts, Rhode Island
Rush River - Minnesota
Rush River - Wisconsin
Russian River - Alaska
Russian River - California

R